İhsan Sabuncuoğlu is a Turkish academic in Industrial Engineering. He is the founding and former rector of Abdullah Gül University in Kayseri, Turkey and now he is former rector of Ted University.Relying on the database of Web Of Science (WOS/all databases), he is appraised as one of three highly successful Turkish industrial engineers regarding to his h index point of scientific productivity.

Biography

İhsan Sabuncuoğlu (born August 16, 1958) is a Turkish academic in industrial engineering. He is the former rector of Abdullah Gul University. He received his B.S. and M.S degrees from Middle East Technical University, in 1982 and 1984, respectively, and his Ph.D. degree from Wichita State University in 1989.

İhsan Sabuncuoğlu worked for Boeing, Pizza Hut and the National Institute of Health in the United States during his PhD studies. He joined Bilkent University in 1990. Between 1990 and 2013, he was a full-time faculty member at Bilkent University Industrial Engineering Department, where he became the chairman in 2006.  He was the chairman of the first engineering department to be accredited by ABET in Turkey. In the meantime, he held visiting positions at Carnegie Mellon University in the United States, and at Institut Français de Mecanique Avancee (IFMA) in France.

As a person who highly gives importance to university-industry collaboration, he established university-industry collaboration center (USIM) in 2010. In addition to his appearance in the assessment committees of TUBITAK and KOSGEB, he gave consultancy services to major manufacturing and service companies for productivity improvement. He is on the Editorial Board of International Journal of Operations and Quantitative Management and Journal of Operations Management. He also acted as the conference chair in several industrial engineering conferences and workshops that were held in Turkey and worldwide.[6]

Dr. Sabuncuoglu is a member of the Institute of Industrial Engineers (IIE)  and Alpha Pi Mu (National Industrial Engineering Honour Society).

He is married to Semra Sabuncuoglu and has two children, Kerem and Arda.

Research

Prof. Sabuncuoglu teaches and conducts research in the areas of simulation, scheduling and applications of optimization models to health care problems such as cancer screening and targeted drug delivery. His research on cancer related health-care problems are funded by TUBITAK and EUREKA. Dr.Sabuncuoglu also has significant industrial experience in aerospace, automative, FMCG and military based defence systems. His industrial projects are sponsored by over hundred of both national and international companies. He is also the founding director of the Bilkent University Industry and the University Collaboration Center (USIM) and the chair of Advanced Machinery and Manufacturing Group (MAKITEG) at TUBITAK.

He has over 100 publications and conference proceedings, which are all published in leading journals. His publications appeared in IIE Transactions, Decision Sciences, International Journal of Production Research, Simulation, Journal of Manufacturing Systems, International Journal of Flexible Manufacturing Systems, International Journal of Computer Integrated Manufacturing, Computers and Operations Research, European Journal of Operational Research, Journal of Operational Research Society, Computers and Industrial Engineering, International Journal of Production Economics, Journal of Intelligent Manufacturing, OMEGA-International Journal of Management Sciences, and Production Planning and Control. He also edited two books, Global Logistics Management and Industrial Engineering Non Traditional Applications in International Settings. Besides to his contributions to many domestic and worldwide projects related to education and industry, he is also a member of the Council of Industrial Engineering Academic Department Heads (CIEADH).

References

External links
Linkedin.com 
 http://www.hurriyet.com.tr/rektor-sabuncuoglu-basarili-bilim-insanlari-listesinde-28322607

1958 births
Living people
Turkish engineers
Academic staff of Bilkent University
Academic staff of Abdullah Gül University